Selling Houses Australia is an Australian reality and lifestyle TV series, based on the British show Selling Houses. The series follows property owners who are having difficulty selling their home. The show is hosted by property expert and author Andrew Winter, who also presented the British version. He is joined by landscaper Dennis Scott and interiors expert Wendy Moore of The Interiors Edit. The team initially assess the property, then proceed with a renovation to boost the property's appeal and saleability. The property is then put up for sale and the result is shown at the end of each episode. The series is produced exclusively for Foxtel by WBITVP.

In 2009 and 2010, the show won ASTRA Awards for Most Outstanding Lifestyle Program and Viewers' Favourite Program.  
In 2013, the show won Most Outstanding Lifestyle Program, and in 2014, was named Favourite Program – Australian. In 2013, Selling Houses Australia was the highest rating LifeStyle Channel series and was the number 1 regular program on Pay TV. In its seventh series, which aired in 2014, the show became the highest rating series in Foxtel history, reaching a cumulative average of 603,000 viewers per episode, and "2.6 million unique people, equivalent to 37% of all Foxtel subscribers" across the series.

In May 2014, it was announced that a five-episode special, Inside Selling Houses Australia, would begin airing on 25 June. The series sees Winter, Albone and Blaze "swap war stories from their seven years together doing property makeovers." The final episode aired in January 2015.

The free-to-air Seven Network picked up the rights to the series and began airing the series from its fifth season on 25 August 2016. The twelfth season premiered on 6 March 2019, and the series will become "the most successful locally produced series" in Australian subscription television history.

In February 2020, Charlie Albone announced he would be leaving the series and would be joining Seven Network’s Better Homes and Gardens from 2020; a casting call was announced for a new landscaper for the series. In March 2021, Shaynna Blaze announced she would also be leaving the series due to a busy schedule. In May 2021, former House Rules judge and interior designer Wendy Moore and former NRL player turn landscape designer Dennis Scott were announced to be joining the series from its 14th season which began airing from 30 March 2022. The fifteenth season will premiere on 22 March 2023.

Cast

Current
 Andrew Winter – (2008-) presenter and professional real estate agent
 Dennis Scott - exterior and garden designer (2022–)
Wendy Moore - interior designer (2022–)

Former
 Charlie Albone – exterior and garden designer (2008–2020)
 Shaynna Blaze – interior designer (2008–2020)

Series overview

Seasons

Season 1 (2008)

Season 2 (2009)

Season 3 (2010)

Season 4 (2011)

Season 5 (2012)

Season 6 (2013)

Season 7 (2014)

Season 8 (2015)

Season 9 (2016)

Season 10 (2017)

Season 11 (2018)

Season 12 (2019)

Season 13 (2020)

Season 14 (2022)

Season 15 (2023)

Specials

Inside Selling Houses Australia (2014–15)

DVD releases

See also

Location Location Location Australia
Deadline Design
Love It or List It Australia

References

External links
Official site

2008 Australian television series debuts
2000s Australian reality television series
2010s Australian reality television series
Lifestyle (Australian TV channel) original programming
Television series by Beyond Television Productions
Television series by Warner Bros. Television Studios
Australian television series based on British television series
2020s Australian reality television series